Nicolaus Mulerius (25 December 1564, Bruges – 5 September 1630, Groningen) was a professor of medicine and mathematics at the University of Groningen.

Education and career
Mulerius was born Nicolaas Des Muliers, son of Pierre Des Muliers and Claudia Le Vettre. He grew up in Bruges, where he was taught by Jacobus Cruquius, among others. Mulerius first studied Philology, Philosophy and Theology and from 1582 he also studied Medicine and Mathematics at the University of Leiden, where Lipsius, Vulcanius, Snellius and Heurnius were teachers. In 1589 he married Christina Six and set up practice for 13 years in Harlingen. In 1603 he became leading physician in Groningen, in 1608 he took the position as school master of the Leeuwarden gymnasium. From 1614 he was professor in medicine and mathematics at the Groningen University. From 1619 – 1621 and 1626 – 1630, he was in charge of the library of the University of Groningen.

Publications
In 1616, Nicolaus Mulerius published a textbook on astronomy reminiscent of the Sphere by Johannes de Sacrobosco.

Also in 1616, he published the third, updated and annotated edition of Nicolaus Copernicus' De revolutionibus orbium coelestium.

An account of the life of Ubbo Emmius, written by Nicolaus Mulerius, was published, with the lives of other professors of Groningen, at Groningen in 1638, eight years after Mulerius' death.

Personal life
Mulerius married Christina Maria Six (1566-1645) in 1589 in Amsterdam.

Works 
Naturae tabulae Frisicae lunae-solares quadruplices, quibus accessere solis ..., 1611
Institutionum astronomicarum libri duo, 1616
Iudæorum annus lunæ-solaris: et Turc-Arabum annus merê lunaris,1630
Naturae tabulae Frisicae lunae-solares quadruplices, quibus accessere solis ..., 1611
Nicolai Mulerii ... Exercitationes in Apocalypsin s. Johannis apostoli, 1691

References

Sources
Lynn Thorndike : History of Magic and Experimental Science. 
Tabitta van Nouhuys: The Age of Two-Faced Janus: The Comets of 1577 and 1618 and the Decline of ... 1998 
Klaas van Berkel, Albert Van Helden, L. C. Palm: A History of Science in the Netherlands: Survey, Themes and Reference 
A.J. van der Aa, Biographisch Woordenboek der Nederlanden, 13th edition, 1876 (Dutch)

1564 births
1630 deaths
17th-century Latin-language writers
17th-century Dutch physicians
Physicians of the Spanish Netherlands
17th-century Dutch astronomers
Academic staff of the University of Groningen
Physicians from Bruges
Leiden University alumni
Scientists from Bruges
16th-century Dutch astronomers